The Muzaffarabad Cricket Stadium (a.k.a. Narol Cricket Stadium;  or MCS) is a cricket stadium in Muzaffarabad, Azad Kashmir. The stadium is situated near Azad Jammu Kashmir Medical College. It has hosted all the matches of the Kashmir Premier League so far.

Matches hosted 
In 2013, the ground hosted five matches of the 2013 Inter-District Under-19 Tournament, and three matches of the 2013–14 Inter-District Senior Tournament. Two years later, it hosted five matches of the 2015 Inter-District Under-19 Tournament, and five matches of the 2015 Inter-District Senior Tournament.

In 2019, it hosted two fixtures of the 2019–20 PCB National Under-19s 3-Day Tournament, and one match of the 2019–20 Quaid-e-Azam Trophy (Grade II) 2019/20.

In 2021, it hosted all 19 matches of the first edition of the Kashmir Premier League. Around 2,500 spectators were allowed to watch the match in the stadium during the tournament due to COVID-19 pandemic in Pakistan.

In 2022, it hosted all 25 matches of the second KPL season.

Gallery

See also
 Quaid-e-Azam Stadium
 Sardar Muhammad Hussain Sport's Complex, Bagh, Azad Kashmir
 Kashmir Premier League (Pakistan)

References

External links
PCB Profile
Cricinfo Profile
CricketArchive Profile

Cricket grounds in Pakistan
Buildings and structures in Azad Kashmir
Sport in Azad Kashmir